Kamel Larbi (born 5 March 1976) is an Algerian judoka. He competed in the men's heavyweight event at the 1996 Summer Olympics.

References

External links
 

1976 births
Living people
Algerian male judoka
Olympic judoka of Algeria
Judoka at the 1996 Summer Olympics
Place of birth missing (living people)
21st-century Algerian people
African Games medalists in judo
Competitors at the 1995 All-Africa Games
African Games bronze medalists for Algeria
20th-century Algerian people